Ōtaki (previously Otaki) is a New Zealand Parliamentary electorate, spanning part of the west coast of the lower North Island. The bulk of its population comes from the Horowhenua District, but it also takes in part of the northern Kapiti Coast, including the towns of Otaki and Waikanae, and part of Paraparaumu. The current MP for Ōtaki is Terisa Ngobi of the Labour Party. She has held this position since the 2020 election.

History
In the 1892 electoral redistribution, population shift to the North Island required the transfer of one seat from the South Island to the north. The resulting ripple effect saw every electorate established in 1890 have its boundaries altered, and eight electorates were established for the first time, including Otaki. Otaki was first contested in the 1893 election, and the first member for Otaki was James Wilson, who held the seat for one term until 1896. It was then won by Henry Augustus Field and then, after Henry's death, by his brother William Hughes Field. William Field, a Liberal-turn-independent-turn-Reform, held it for a total of 32 years, from 1900 to 1935. Field lost the electorate in 1911 to John Robertson of the Social Democratic Party (who had been nominated by the flax-workers union), but won it back in 1914.

The seat was abolished in 1972, and Allan McCready, who was the incumbent, instead stood for and won the Manawatu electorate.

Otaki was recreated ahead of the change to mixed-member proportional (MMP) voting in 1996, by combining two bellwether seats: the northern half of Kapiti with the entire Horowhenua seat. Since its recreation the boundaries have been left largely unaltered, though after the 2007 boundary review a macron was added to the name and it is now spelled Ōtaki. The first MP for Otaki since its recreation was Judy Keall, who won by less than a thousand votes in 1996 before a more decisive victory in 1999. In 2002, her former electorate assistant Darren Hughes won the seat, becoming the youngest member of the House of Representatives. His 2002 majority was slashed to just 382 at the 2005 election by former Horowhenua District councillor Nathan Guy. In a 2008 rematch, Guy tipped out Hughes by 1,354 votes; Hughes returned to Parliament off the Labour Party list.

Nathan Guy won Ōtaki for National at every election since 2008; at the 2017 election Guy won 50.3% of the vote compared with the second-place Rob McCann getting 35.4%. Guy announced he would be resigning at the 2020 election, and National have selected Tim Costley as its replacement candidate.

In the 2020 election, Terisa Ngobi returned the seat to Labour in a tight contest, winning 17,953 of the votes compared to Tim Costley's 16,683 votes based on preliminary results.

Members of Parliament
Unless otherwise stated, all MPs' terms began and ended at general elections.

Key

List MPs
Members of Parliament elected from party lists in elections where that person also unsuccessfully contested the electorate. Unless otherwise stated, all MPs' terms began and ended at general elections.

Election results

2020 election

2017 election

2014 election

2011 election

Electorate (as at 26 November 2011): 47,483

2008 election

2005 election

1999 election
Refer to Candidates in the New Zealand general election 1999 by electorate#Otaki for a list of candidates.

1943 election

1938 election

1935 election

1931 election

1928 election

1900 by-election

Footnotes

References

Sources

External links
Electorate Profile  Parliamentary Library

New Zealand electorates
Politics of the Wellington Region
1893 establishments in New Zealand
1972 disestablishments in New Zealand
1996 establishments in New Zealand